The Soul Purpose is the debut studio album from Boston underground hip hop duo 7L & Esoteric. The album was released on July 24, 2001. After years of doing guest verses for other acts, and releasing songs such as "Be Alert" on their own; the duo managed to garner significant hype in the underground hip hop community. They even received press in The Source, and attracted enough attention to get a guest verse from Inspectah Deck. All of this culminated into a record deal with Landspeed, 9 years after the group's original formation.

Track listing

Singles chart positions

References

7L & Esoteric albums
2001 debut albums